The Arme Planante À Charges Éjectables or Apache is a French-developed, air-launched, anti-runway cruise missile manufactured by MBDA France. The SCALP EG missile is based on it, notably featuring similar aerodynamics and stealth. However, the latter has a different propulsion system and carries a single high-penetration warhead instead of the Apache's cluster submunitions.

See also 
 SCALP EG
 BLU-107 Durandal

References

MBDA Apache
Cruise missiles of France
Anti-runway weapons
Cluster munition